The men's light-heavyweight event was part of the weightlifting programme at the 1924 Summer Olympics. The weight class was the second-heaviest contested, and allowed weightlifters of up to 82.5 kilograms (181.5 pounds). The competition was held on Wednesday, 23 July 1924.

Results
One hand snatch

One hand clean & jerk

Press

Two hand snatch

Two hand clean & jerk

Final standing after the last event:

References

Sources
Olympic Report
 

Light-heavyweight